The Arizona Wildcats college football team competes as part of the National Collegiate Athletic Association (NCAA) Division I Football Bowl Subdivision (FBS), and represents the University of Arizona in the South Division of the Pac-12 Conference (Pac-12). All-America selections are individual player recognitions made after each season when numerous publications release lists of their ideal team. The NCAA recognizes five All-America lists: the Associated Press (AP), American Football Coaches Association (AFCA), the Football Writers Association of America (FWAA), Sporting News (SN), and the Walter Camp Football Foundation (WCFF). In order for an honoree to earn a "consensus" selection, he must be selected as first team in three of the five lists recognized by the NCAA, and "unanimous" selections must be selected as first team in all five lists.

Since the establishment of the team in 1894, Arizona has had 29 players honored a total of 34 times as First Team All-America for their performance on the field of play. Included in these selections are 8 consensus selections, 2 of which were unanimous selections earned by Ka'Deem Carey in the 2012 season and 2013 season and Scooby Wright III in the 2015 season.

Key

Selectors

Arizona Wildcats Football First Team All-Americans

References

Arizona
Arizona Wildcats football players
Arizona Wildcats football All-Americans